Seacrest is a surname. Notable people with the surname include:

Bernadette Seacrest (born 1965), American vocalist
Ryan Seacrest (born 1974), American radio personality, television host, and producer

See also
Seacrest, Florida
Secrest
Drillship Seacrest